The 25th Filipino Academy of Movie Arts and Sciences Awards Night was held on May 20, 1978, at The Philippine International Convention Center ( Plenary Hall).  This is for the Outstanding Achievements of the different  films for the year 1977.

Bakya mo Neneng of J.E. Productions won the most award with 6 wins including FAMAS Award for Best Picture, Best Director, Best Screenplay, Best Cinematography, Best Sound and Best Musical Score but its lead stars, Nora Aunor and Joseph Estrada failed to win an acting Awards. On the other hand, Dolphy won his first his FAMAS best Actor award for the movie "Omeng Santanasia" and Susan Roces as best actress for her movie,"Maligno".

Awards

Major Awards
Winners are listed first and highlighted with boldface.

{| class=wikitable
|-
! style="background:#EEDD82; width:50%" | Best Picture
! style="background:#EEDD82; width:50%" | Best Director
|-
| valign="top" |
 Bakya Mo Neneng — J.E. Productions Maligno — Rosas Productions 
| valign="top" |
 Augusto Buenaventura— Bakya Mo Neneng
 Pablo Santiago — Bontoc 
 Manuel Conde — Hostage... Hanapin si Batuigas! 
 Celso Ad. Castillo —  Sa Dulo ng Krus 
 Lino Brocka — Tahan na Empoy, Tahan 
|-
! style="background:#EEDD82; width:50%" | Best Actor
! style="background:#EEDD82; width:50%" | Best Actress
|-
| valign="top" |
 Dolphy — Omeng Satanasia
 Joseph Estrada — Bakya mo Neneng
 George Estregan — Hostage... Hanapin si Batuigas! 
 Christopher De Leon — Masarap, masakit ang umibig 
 Bembol Roco — Sa piling ng mga sugapa:  
| valign="top" |
 Susan Roces — Maligno
 Nora Aunor — Bakya mo Neneng 
 Vilma Santos — Burlesk Queen 
 Daria Ramirez — Sinong kapiling? Sinong kasiping? 
 Alicia Alonzo — Tahan na Empoy, tahan 
|-
! style="background:#EEDD82; width:50%" | Best Supporting Actor
! style="background:#EEDD82; width:50%" | Best Supporting Actress
|-
| valign="top" |
 Mat Ranillo III — Masarap, masakit ang umibig
 Leroy Salvador — Mga bilanggong birhen 
 Roldan Aquino — Burlesk Queen 
 Leopoldo Salcedo — Halikan mo at magpaalam sa kahapon 
 Ruel Vernal — Walang katapusang tag-araw 
| valign="top" |
 Armida Siguion-Reyna — Tahan na Empoy, tahan
 Olivia Sanchez — Bakya mo Neneng 
 Rosemarie Gil — Burlesk Queen 
 Dexter Doria — Inay 
 Liza Lorena — Walang katapusang tag-araw 
|-
! style="background:#EEDD82; width:50%" | Best Child Performer
! style="background:#EEDD82; width:50%" | Best Theme Song
|-
| valign="top" |
  Niño Muhlach — Tahan na Empoy, tahan
 Vernadeth Calingbayan — Halikan mo at magpaalam sa kahapon 
 Maritess Ardieta— Maligno'' 
 | valign="top" |
 Ryan Cayabyab  — Paraisong Parisukat for the movie Masikip, Maluwag 
|-
! style="background:#EEDD82; width:50%" | Best in Screenplay
! style="background:#EEDD82; width:50%" | Best Story
|-
| valign="top" |
  Augusto Buenaventura, Diego Cagahastian— Bakya mo Neneng| valign="top" |
  Ruther Batuigas — Hostage: Hanapin Si Batuigas 
|-
! style="background:#EEDD82; width:50%" | Best Sound 
! style="background:#EEDD82; width:50%" | Best Musical Score
|-
| valign="top" |
    Gregorio Ella  — Bakya Mo Neneng 
| valign="top" |
   Ernani Cuenco  — Bakya Mo Neneng 
|-
! style="background:#EEDD82; width:50%" | Best Cinematography 
! style="background:#EEDD82; width:50%" | Best Production Design
|-
| valign="top" |
   Fredy Conde — Bakya Mo Neneng| valign="top" |
 Laida Perez — Mga Bilanggong Birhen|-
! style="background:#EEDD82; width:50%" | Best Musical Film
! style="background:#EEDD82; width:50%" | Best Comedy Film
|-
| valign="top" |
   — Pag-ibig Ko'y Awitin Mo| valign="top" |
   Little Christmas Tree — FPJ Productions|-
! style="background:#EEDD82; width:50%" |  Best Editing
|-
| valign="top" |
  Edgardo Vinarao — Hostage: Hanapin Si Batuigas|-
|}

Special Awardee

 Lifetime Achievement Award Gerardo de Leon Loyalty Award Tino Lapuz Special Sound Effects Jun Martinez Best Still Photography Charles Peralta Best Performance in a Standard Role (neither leading or supporting) Boyet Orca Hall of Fame Awardee: ~ Premiere Productions, Inc. - Producer'''
1976 - Minsa'y Isang Gamu-Gamo
1960 - Huwag Mo Akong Limutin
1957 - Kalibre .45
1954 - Salabusab
1952 - Ang Sawa Sa Lumang Simboryo

References

External links
FAMAS Awards 

FAMAS Award
FAMAS
FAMAS